Pa Pa Pa Pa Puffy (also known as Pa-Pa-Pa-Pa Puffy) was a variety TV show which aired in Japan (TV Asahi) from 1 October 1997 to 27 March 2002, and re-aired as a PUFFY 10th anniversary broadcast for a short time in 2006. It was hosted by Ami Onuki and Yumi Yoshimura. Rodney Greenblat was responsible for most of the visual design of the show.

Pa-Pa-Pa-Pa-Puffy featured guests such as Lenny Kravitz, Sylvester Stallone, Harrison Ford, Aerosmith, and rock band Garbage.

Main cast
 Ami Onuki
 Yumi Yoshimura
The Puppets
 Muffy, a yellow squirrel who narrates some segments of the show.
 Little Lemon, a lemon like puppet creature with a high-pitched voice.
 Very Shy Mouse, a gray shy mouse that does not say much.
 Captain Catfish, a catfish who speaks in a very gruff voice.
 Cosmo, a parrot who is little known about.

Semi-Regulars
Men
 Yo Oizumi
 Pierre Taki
Women
 Nanase Aikawa
 Miho Kanno
 Tomoe Shinohara

External links
 2000 Official Site
 2002 English Site

References 

Puffy AmiYumi
1997 Japanese television series debuts
2002 Japanese television series endings
Japanese variety television shows
TV Asahi original programming